Dheri is a town and union council of Mardan District in the Khyber Pakhtunkhwa province of Pakistan. It is the biggest village of Dheri union council wherein KakaKhel (the founding tribe), Aku Khel, Uttmanzai, Behzad Khel, Kulalan, Juhlagan tribes live.

It is located at 34°1'N 72°57'E at an altitude of 514 metres (1689 feet).

References

Union councils of Mardan District
Populated places in Mardan District